

Kathleen R. McKeown is an American computer scientist, specializing in natural language processing. She is currently the Henry and Gertrude Rothschild Professor of Computer Science and is the Founding Director of the Institute for Data Sciences and Engineering at Columbia University.

McKeown received her B.A. from Brown University in 1976 and her PhD in Computer Science in 1982 from the University of Pennsylvania and has spent her career at Columbia. She was the first woman to be tenured in the university's School of Engineering and Applied Science and was the first woman to serve as Chair of the Department of Computer Science, from 1998 to 2003. She has also served as Vice Dean for Research in the School of Engineering and Applied Science.

She has held the positions of President, Vice President, and Secretary-Treasurer of the Association for Computational Linguistics and has been a board member and secretary of the board of the Computing Research Association.

McKeown's research focuses on natural language processing and has included the Newsblaster multi-document summarization program to derive summary news stories from the contents of a number of news sites; for a few years this included multilingual news.

Honors
 1985 Presidential Young Investigator Award, National Science Foundation
 1991 Faculty Award for Women, National Science Foundation
 1994 AAAI Fellow
 2003 ACM Fellow
 2010 Anita Borg Institute Women of Vision Award in Innovation
 2012 Association for Computational Linguistics founding Fellow
 2019 Elected to the American Academy of Arts and Sciences
 2022 Elected to the American Philosophical Society

Selected publications
Text Generation: Using Discourse Strategies and Focus Constraints to Generate Natural Language Text. Studies in natural language processing. Cambridge/New York: Cambridge University, 1985, 2nd ed. 1992. .
with Ani Nenkova. Automatic Summarization. Foundations and Trends in Information Retrieval 5:2–3. Hanover, Massachusetts: Now, 2011. .

References

External links

Kathleen McKeown's faculty page at Columbia University

Living people
Columbia School of Engineering and Applied Science faculty
Brown University alumni
University of Pennsylvania alumni
American women computer scientists
American computer scientists
Fellows of the Association for the Advancement of Artificial Intelligence
Fellows of the American Academy of Arts and Sciences
Fellows of the Association for Computing Machinery
Fellows of the Association for Computational Linguistics
Year of birth missing (living people)
Natural language processing researchers
Computational linguistics researchers
21st-century American women
Members of the American Philosophical Society